Melissa Suzanne McBride (born May 23, 1965) is an American actress. Her breakout role was Carol Peletier on the AMC series The Walking Dead (2010–2022). She has garnered critical acclaim and received multiple awards and nominations for her role on the show. Originally cast in a minor role, McBride's role expanded over time to a main cast member and as of 2020, she is the second billed cast member in the opening credits of the show, and one of only two cast members to appear in every season (the other being Norman Reedus).

Early life 
McBride was born in Lexington, Kentucky, to parents John Leslie McBride and Suzanne Lillian (née Sagley). Her father owned his own business, and her mother studied at the historic Pasadena Playhouse. She had three siblings: John Michael, Neil Allen, and Melanie Suzanne.

Career 
McBride began her acting career in 1991, appearing in several television commercials for clients such as Rooms To Go; she was also a spokeswoman for Ford. She made her series television debut in a 1993 episode of ABC legal drama series Matlock, and later guest-starred in several other television drama series, including In the Heat of the Night; American Gothic; Profiler; Walker, Texas Ranger; and Dawson's Creek. In the last, she played Nina – a film buff who charms Dawson after his breakup with Jen – in the Season 1 episode "Road Trip" (1998) – and in 2003 returned to the series finale playing a different character.

In the 1990s, McBride had supporting roles in several made-for-television movies, such as Her Deadly Rival (1995) opposite Annie Potts and Harry Hamlin, Close to Danger (1997) with Rob Estes, Any Place But Home (1997), and Pirates of Silicon Valley (1999). In 1996, she appeared on the CBS miniseries A Season in Purgatory, based on Dominick Dunne's eponymous 1993 novel. From 2000 to 2010, she worked as a film and commercial casting director in Atlanta, Georgia and starred in several short films. In 2007, director Frank Darabont cast McBride as the "woman with the kids at home" in the ensemble-cast science-fiction horror film The Mist, alongside Thomas Jane, Laurie Holden, and Marcia Gay Harden. McBride was in contention for a bigger role in the film but did not want to take a significant amount of time away from her job as a casting director. The following year, she appeared in the Lifetime television movie Living Proof.

In 1996, McBride acted alongside both Martin Sheen and Ramon Estevez in the music video for country music group Diamond Rio's single It's All In Your Head.

The Walking Dead 

McBride was cast as Carol Peletier in the AMC television drama series The Walking Dead – her biggest role to date. Peletier begins as a mid-forties abused wife and caring mother to preteen Sophia, fighting to survive in a violent post-apocalyptic world populated with flesh-eating zombies and the few surviving humans, some of whom are diabolical and even more dangerous than the zombies themselves. McBride did not audition for the role, which she thought was temporary. She was a recurring cast member in Season 1 and was promoted to series regular for Season 2. McBride's name appeared in the opening credits sequence beginning with the first episode of Season 4. Carol was supposed to have been killed off in the episode "Killer Within", but the producers eventually had a change of plans.

As the series progresses, McBride's character develops from being weak and dependent, into a strong, cunning, and loyal warrior. The direction of her character is contrasted between the two media. In the comic series, Carol is much younger and exhibits a neurotic, self-centered, and naive demeanor. Throughout her time in the comics, she grows increasingly unstable to the point of being self-destructive. The television show differs in these regards, as she is shown to be a stern, pragmatic, and compassionate individual who has been gradually building inner strength. Producers of the series, Scott M. Gimple and Robert Kirkman, said in 2014 that "Carol is her own unique character; it would be a disservice to Melissa McBride to say she's evolved into the Carol from the comics. The Carol in the TV show is a wholly original creation that we'll continue to explore on the show to great effect. Everyone in the writers' room loves that character, and we're thrilled with what Melissa has brought to the table. She has definitely become a character that is one to watch, and there's some really exciting stuff ahead for her."

McBride has received critical acclaim for her performance as Carol and won positive reviews from critics during Seasons 3, 4, and 5. Many critics praised McBride's performance in the Season 4 episode centered on her character, "The Grove". Others singled out Carol's actions in the Season 5 premiere, "No Sanctuary", which earned critical praise and positive fan reception. Despite the praise of some critics and a fan campaign, McBride did not receive a nomination for the 2014 Primetime Emmy Award for Outstanding Supporting Actress in a Drama Series. In March 2015, McBride was nominated for a Fangoria Chainsaw Award for Best Leading Actress in a Television series, for her role as Carol. She once again won the  Saturn Award for Best Supporting Actress on Television at the 41st Saturn Awards, for the second year in a row.

McBride was set to reprise her role as Carol in a spin-off series centered on her and Daryl Dixon (played by Norman Reedus), following the conclusion of the 11th and final season of The Walking Dead, which is set to debut in 2023. In April 2022, it was reported that McBride dropped out of the series which was relocated to Europe, with AMC citing that McBride's decision to drop out was because it was "logistically untenable" for her to film in Europe.

Personal life 
In the mid-1980s, McBride moved to Atlanta, where she still lives.

Filmography

Film

Television

Video games

Casting director 
 The Last Adam (2006)
 The Promise (2007)
 Golden Minutes (2009)
 This Side Up (2009)
 The Party (2010)
 Broken Moment (2010)

Awards and nominations

References

External links 

 
 

1965 births
20th-century American actresses
21st-century American actresses
Actors from Lexington, Kentucky
Actresses from Atlanta
Actresses from Kentucky
American film actresses
American television actresses
American casting directors
Women casting directors
Living people